Gurley is a small town in the northwest of New South Wales, Australia between Narrabri and Moree. The Newell Highway and the North-West railway line pass through the township. A now-closed railway station opened in 1897.

Gurley Siding Post Office opened on 16 March 1898 and was renamed Gurley in 1917.

Gurley railway station

References

Towns in New South Wales
Moree Plains Shire
Newell Highway